William Henry Crane (April 30, 1845March 7, 1928) was an American actor.

Early years
Crane was born in Leicester, Massachusetts on April 30, 1845. He grew up in Boston and graduated from Brimmer School.

Career
He made his first professional appearance at Utica, New York, in Donizetti's The Daughter of the Regiment on July 13, 1865. Later he had a great success as Le Blanc the Notary, in the burlesque Evangeline (1873). He made his first hit in the legitimate drama with Stuart Robson (1836–1903), in The Comedy of Errors and other Shakespearian plays, and in The Henrietta (1881) by Bronson Howard (1842–1908). This partnership lasted for 12 years, and subsequently Crane appeared in various eccentric character parts in such plays as The Senator and David Harum.

In 1904 he turned to more serious work and played Isidore Izard in Business is Business, an adaptation from Octave Mirbeau's Les Affaires sont les Affaires.

In his 70s, Crane appeared in a number of films, notably in a reprise of his role in David Harum (1915). He also appeared in MGM's Three Wise Fools, a film that was revived on Turner Classic Movies and is available on home video/DVD.

Death
Crane died on March 7, 1928, at the age of 82 in the Hollywood Hotel.

Partial filmography
 The Lamb (1915)
 David Harum (1915)
 The Saphead (1920)
 Souls for Sale (1923)
 Three Wise Fools (1923)
 Souls for Sale (1923)
 True as Steel (1924)
 So This Is Marriage (1924)

References

 
"W. H. Crane" by Joseph Howard, Jr. in Famous American Actors of To-day, edited by Frederic Edward McKay and Charles E. L. Wingate, New York, Thomas Y. Crowell & Company, 1896. Online here.
"Crane-Robson" in Some Players: Personal Sketches by Amy Leslie, Herbert S. Stone & Company, Chicago & New York, 1901. Online here.
"William H. Crane, A Study", By Edwin F. Edgett in Frank Leslie's Popular Monthly, January 1903 (Volume LV No. 3). Online here. (Illustration here).

External links

 
 

1845 births
1928 deaths
People from Leicester, Massachusetts
Male actors from Massachusetts
19th-century American male actors
American male stage actors
Burials at Hollywood Forever Cemetery
American male film actors